Lebanon Branch may refer to:
Lebanon Branch (Ohio) of the Pennsylvania Railroad
Lebanon Branch (Pennsylvania) of the Pennsylvania Railroad
Louisville and Nashville Railroad Lebanon Branch